The following elections occurred in the year 1843.

North America

United States
 United States Senate election in New York, 1843

See also
 :Category:1843 elections

1843
Elections